Mary Josepha Nowland (born Catherine Elizabeth Nowland; 16 June 1863 – 14 December 1935) was a New Zealand Catholic nun and teacher. She was born in Gunnedah, New South Wales, Australia, in 1863.

References

1863 births
1935 deaths
19th-century New Zealand Roman Catholic nuns
Australian emigrants to New Zealand
20th-century New Zealand Roman Catholic nuns